Shemshevo is a village in northern Bulgaria, part of Veliko Tarnovo Municipality, Veliko Tarnovo Province. Shemshevo village is located on the left bank of the Yantra River about four kilometers west of the town of Veliko Tarnovo. Its land features diverse terrain with varying altitudes - from 130 m for the low lowlands to 210 meters in the southern part of the village. The population of the village is 579 people. The majority of the population is between 35 and 55 years old.

In recent years many young families with small children have made their home here. They are attracted by village's proximity to the municipal center Veliko Tarnovo and convenient transportation to the city. The village's peaceful and quiet atmosphere, plenty of fresh air and many places for walking in the mountains or along the river make it suitable for raising children.

History 
The valley of the Yantra River near the village of Shemshevo was inhabited since ancient times. The archaeological materials show that a settlement has existed since the end of the twelfth and early thirteenth century during the Second Bulgarian Empire. Until 1861 the religious needs of the village are served by monks - ascetics from neighboring monasteries. The village's church "St. Dimitar" was built in 1861 with volunteer work and donations from the villagers.

Landmarks 
The Thracian fortress Little Myal is situated south of the village. The castle is located on the Little Myal height. It is built in the shape of a semi-ellipse with dimensions 40 x 150 meters. It is described in the works of K. Shkorpil, a Czech - Bulgarian archaeologist and museum activist and the discoverer of the first Bulgarian capital Pliska. The fortified wall protects the area from the east, west and north. The wall is built with larger stones without mortar - masonry typical of the old Iron Age.

The Blue Pool is a small waterfall located southeast of the village. The area is a favorite place of residents and guests for picnics in spring and summer.

Culture, customs and traditions 
The community center "Progress" has a theater hall with 120 seats, library and information center. It is the home of choir "Bulgarian" established in 1984 under the baton of the artistic director Mr. Rajko Dolapchiev. For the past 30 yearschoir "Bulgarian" has won many wards. Traditionally, the village celebrates the following holidays: Trifon's Day, National holiday of Palm Sunday, Grandmother's Day, Children's Day. St. Lazarus' Day ritual ("lazarouvane") celebrates the arrival of spring. It is held eight days before Easter. On this day children pick willow branches and decorate the doors.

The village is home to many prominent artists like the sculptor Angel Angelov and the painter Stancho Ganev who has his own art gallery here. Violeta Dobrinova and Venelin Petrov make beautiful pottery in their studio in the village.

References

 

Towns in Bulgaria
Municipalities in Veliko Tarnovo Province